The 1986 Caldwell, Ohio boys cross country running team has been recognized as the 1986 National Championship High School boys cross country team regardless of size.  The team had a regular season record of 137 wins and 0 losses.  The team also set Ohio High School Boys Cross Country State Meet records for lowest point total (26) as well as largest margin of victory (85).  Caldwell High School has been called "The most successful school in Ohio boys cross country" by the Ohio High School Athletic Association (OHSAA).  The 1986 Team along with the other Caldwell Boys  State Championship teams were recognized in 2016 at a Caldwell High School Basketball game in which banners were hung in the Gym to recognize their teams accomplishments.

The 1986 varsity team members included;
 Seniors: Tony Carna, P.J. Norris, Randy Lowe 
 Juniors: Brian Norris, Stacy Huffman, Danny Lowe 
 Freshman: Steve Ferguson  
 Coaches: Head Coach Ron Martin  Assistant Coach: Dugan Hill

Caldwell 1986 Season Record (137-0; duel meet scoring)

Members of the Ohio Association of Track and Field and Cross Country (OATCCC) Hall of Fame 
 Dugan Hill 1996 Induction 
 Ron Martin 1997 Induction
 Tony Carna 2006 Induction

References 

High school sports in Ohio
Noble County, Ohio
Cross country running in the United States